Metizoline (trade name Ellsyl) is a nasal decongestant against allergic and vasomotor rhinitis.

References 

Imidazolines
Benzothiophenes